Bridgegate in Chester, Cheshire, England, forms part of the city walls.  It is recorded in the National Heritage List for England as a designated Grade I listed building.

History
The Roman city walls were extended to the south in the 12th century with a wall parallel to the north bank of the River Dee.  This section of the wall incorporated the original Bridgegate which must have been built by the 1120s, as the office of sergeant of the gate was recorded in that decade.  The gate guarded the southern entrance to the town; the road from North Wales ran through the gateway directly after crossing the Old Dee Bridge.  It is possible that the gateway was rebuilt at the time the bridge was rebuilt in the later part of the 14th century.  Between 1521 and 1624 the bridge tolls were controlled by the Talbot family, the Earls of Shrewsbury, whose town house, now the Bear and Billet, was nearby.

At the end of the 15th century the bridge consisted of a Gothic arch with a tower on each side. In 1600–01 a square tower was added which contained machinery for lifting river water into the town.  This was known as John Tyrer's Water Tower, after its builder, but the tower was destroyed in the siege of Chester in 1644–65.  The present bridge was built in 1781 for Chester City Corporation, the architect being Joseph Turner.

Architecture
Bridgegate is built in yellow sandstone ashlar in neoclassical style and consists of a segmental arch over the carriageway with a round pedestrian archway in each abutment. Along its top are balustraded parapets on each side of the footpath.

See also

Grade I listed buildings in Cheshire West and Chester
Northgate, Chester
Watergate, Chester
Eastgate, Chester

References

External links 
 The Bridgegate on 'Chester: a Virtual Stroll Around the Walls'

Bridges in Cheshire
Bridgegate
Former toll bridges in England
Stone bridges in England
Town Gates in England
Grade I listed bridges
Grade I listed buildings in Chester
Grade I listed gates
Joseph Turner (architect) buildings
Neoclassical architecture in Cheshire
Stone arch bridges